Nomurabacteria is a candidate phylum of bacteria belonging to the CPR group so they are ultra-small bacteria. They have been found in a wide variety of environments, mainly in sediments under anaerobic conditions.

Bacteria of this phylum share several of their characteristics with other ultra-small bacteria: such as nanometric size, small genomes, reduced metabolism, low capacity to synthesize nucleotides and aminoacids, they lack respiratory chains and the Krebs cycle. In addition, many can be endosymbionts of larger bacteria.

Phylogenetic analyzes have suggested that Nomurabacteria and the other ultra-small bacteria make up the most basal clade of all bacteria. The archaea of the DPANN group are ultra-small archaea that share the same characteristics with these bacteria and are the most basal group of the archaeo-eukaryotic clade, although it can also be paraphyletic of eukaryotes and the other archaea as will be seen below.

In some phylogenetic analyzes of the proteome, ultra-small bacteria emerge outside the traditional bacterial domain and emerge as a paraphyletic group of traditional Bacteria and the clade composed of archaea and eukaryotes. In these analyzes Nomurabacteria turns out to be the most basal clade of all cellular organisms.

Phylogeny 

Proteome analyzes have shown that Nomurabacteria can be the most basal clade of cellular organisms and that the other CPR bacteria are a paraphyletic group as can be seen in the cladogram that shows the phylogenetic relationships between multiple bacterial, archaean and eukaryotes.

References 

Bacteria
Candidatus taxa